Ibadan Records is an independent music label founded in 1995 by DJ and music producer, Jerome Sydenham in New York City and is now run out of Berlin, Germany. Ibadan Records is principal to other labels including: Apotek Records, Avocado Records, Bolshevic Records, Public Service Records and UK Promotions. The label recently celebrated its 15-year anniversary in 2010 while also reaching the mark of over 100 releases. The label's motto is: "A higher quality experience in music".

Says Jerome Sydenham, "There isn't really an Ibadan sound. Ibadan has a principle to make high quality music which covers all areas of electronic music, acoustic dance music, ultimately jazz funk, jazz and maybe even hip hop and R&B".

History
Formed over passionate discussions Jerome Sydenham had with Dance Tracks (a record shop) owner Joe Claussell as well as fellow music producer Kerri Chandler, the label was, in its beginnings, to rework the prestigious Ten City catalogue, which Jerome Sydenham obtained after his resignation in his A&R role at Atlantic Records. Building up a steady slew of quality House music releases over the years, the label has since evolved to include Techno and Tech-house genres and continues to pioneer new directions in dance music. The label is also attributed to having greatly defined the Pan-African Electro sound of House and Techno music today with established artists such as Joe Claussell, Kerri Chandler and Dennis Ferrer forming the backbone of its repertoire.

Over the years, Ibadan Records has had countless of iconic releases of critical acclaim, including Joe Claussell's compilation "Language" in 1999 which features productions by Claussell, Sydenham, Chandler, Marc Cary and Dele Sosimi. The compilation is widely considered as a milestone in the deep house genre. 2001 saw the release of Jerome Sydenham's own full-length collaboration with Kerri Chandler, "Saturday".

In 2003, Ibadan Records launched the 10 Inch Beats (TIB) series to feature the more edgy electronic side of the Ibadan sound. This series was responsible for hits Jerome Sydenham co-produced with Dennis Ferrer, including "Sandcastles" and "Timbuktu". "Sandcastles" entered the official UK Dance Charts in March 2005 after eighteen months of steady sales and momentum building on Ibadan Records. The track also received the prestigious title of "Track of the Year 2005" by Choice Awards (US).

Sublabels
 African Express
 Apotek Records 
 Avocado Records 
 Ibadan TIB 
 UK Promotions

Artists past and present

 32 Project
 785
 A Hundred Birds
 A.V.
 Adam Beyer
 Afterlife
 Alistair Colling
 Angel Rodriguez
 Anthony Collins
 Antonio Ocasio
 Argy
 Aschka
 ATFC
 Audio Injection
 Bajka
 Bas Noir
 Basement Jaxx
 Basic Soul Unit
 Beanfield
 Ben Onono
 Beth Orton
 Bioground
 Bobby Konders
 Carl Craig
 Charles Webster
 Christian Prommer
 Claude VonStroke
 Club Lonely
 Daniel Moreno
 Danny Krivit
 David Morales
 Dele Sosimi
 Dennis Ferrer
 Derrick May
 Dimitri from Paris
 DJ Camacho
 DJ Jinwook
 DJ Koze
 DJ Nori
 DJ Oji
 DJ Said
 DJ Yellow
 Djaimin
 DOS
 Downtown Brooklyn Inc.
 Drumcell
 East4A
 Ed Davenport
 Eddie Niguel
 Fantastic Plastic Machine
 Ferrer & Sydenham Inc.
 Flora Cruz
 Francesco Mami
 Francesco Rossi
 Fred P
 Freeform Five
 Fudge
 Function
 Gabriel Chong
 Gaz Nevada
 Gbedu Resurrection
 Gilles Peterson
 Glenn Lewis
 GummiHz
 H.O.S.H.
 Harrison Crump
 Henrik Schwarz
 Herb Martin
 Hideo Kobayashi
 Incognito
 Ink & Needle
 Instant House
 Iramo
 Iroko
 Janne Tavi
 Jãnia
 Jaxxapellas
 Jehlaz
 Jephte Guillaume
 Jerome Sydenham
 Joe Claussell
 Johanna Saint-Pierre
 John Dahlback
 Jon Cutler
 Jori Hulkonnen
 Joris Voorn
 Julian Jabre
 Ken Ishii
 Kerri Chandler
 King Britt
 Ko Kimura
 Lagos Nagoya Players Association
 Laid
 Larry Levan
 Man from the Nile
 Marc Cary
 Mark Broom
 Mark Knight
 Marlon D
 Martijn ten Velden
 Martin Solveig
 Mathew Jonson
 Matt Moran
 Michael Cole
 Michael Watford
 Mission Control
 MKL
 Motorcitysoul
 Nagano Kitchen
 Nature Soul
 Next Evidence
 Nick Dunton
 Nicolas Laget
 Nikola Gala
 Nina Simone
 No Mad Ronin
 Onionz
 Osunlade
 Oule Oule
 Pal Joey
 Paul Mayers
 Pete Heller
 Peter and Tyrone
 Planetary Assault Systems
 POSH! The Prince
 Quell
 Radio Slave
 Rasmus Faber
 Richard Polson
 Ricky L
 Romantic Couch
 Rudoulpho
 Rune
 Ryuichi Sakamoto
 Samuel L Session
 Sephia
 Shigeru Tanabu
 Silent Servant
 Slam
 Slam Mode
 Soul Assassin
 Stefan Alexis
 Sten Gun
 Steve Travolta
 Sueño Latino
 T Kolai
 T.Tauri
 Taha Elroubi
 Ten City
 Texu
 The Martinez Brothers
 The Songstress
 The System
 Third Generation
 Tiger Stripes
 Timmy Regisford
 Titanic
 Tony Ransom
 Tony Watson
 Trentemøller
 Una
 Vera Mara
 Vince Watson
 Wayne Gardiner
 Willie Graff
 Xhin
 Zero Duma
 Zion Lockwood

Selected album and compilation discography
 2012: Various - Ibadan - Animal Social Club
 2012: Argy - Fundamentals
 2011: Various - Ibadan -  Beginnings Revisited' (Vol 1.)
 2008: Various - Ibadan -  Deep Strokes (Vol 2.)
 2008: Various - Ibadan -  Pan African Electro (Vol 2.)
 2008: Various - Ibadan -  Pan African Electro (Vol 1.)
 2008: Various - Ibadan -  Afrotonic
 2008: Various - Ibadan -  Deep Strokes (Vol 1.)
 2006: Various Electric Pussycat starring Jerome Sydenham as Casino J
 2006: Various - Underground Dance Music Vol. 1
 2005: Various - Explosive Hi Fidelity Sounds DJ Mix by Jerome Sydenham
 2004: Slam Mode - Signals
 2004: Various - Space Lab Yellow (Phase 4) compiled by Jerome Sydenham and Ryo Watanabe
 2003: Various - Ibadan People DJ Mix by Jerome Sydenham
 2003: Various - Space Lab Yellow (Phase 3) compiled by Jerome Sydenham and Ryo Watanabe
 2002: Vince Watson - Moments in Time
 2002: Various - Space Lab Yellow (Phase 2) compiled by Jerome Sydenham and Ryo Watanabe
 2001: Various - Space Lab Yellow (Phase 1) compiled by Jerome Sydenham and Ryo Watanabe
 2001: Various - Ibadan - Saturday
 2001: Ten City - The Best Of

See also
 List of record labels
 List of electronic music record labels

References

https://www.discogs.com/label/836-Ibadan

External links
 Ibadan Records
 Ibadan Records Music Store

House music record labels
American record labels
New York (state) record labels
Companies based in New York City
German record labels
Companies based in Berlin
Electronic music record labels
Record labels established in 1995